Rubramoena is a genus of sea slugs, aeolid nudibranchs, marine gastropod molluscs in the family Fionidae.

Species within the genus Rubramoena include:
 Rubramoena amoena (Alder & Hancock, 1845)
 Rubramoena rubescens (Picton & Brown, 1978)

References 

Fionidae